The Battle of Deeg, fought on 13 November 1804, took place outside Deeg, now in the Bharatpur district of Rajasthan, India. A force of the British East India Company led by Major General Fraser defeated a Maratha force under Yashwantrao Holkar and a force of Hindu Jats led by Maharaja Ranjit Singh. Fraser was himself mortally wounded in the attack. The British captured about 87 guns of the enemy's 160. British casualties were over 640 killed or wounded. Maratha casualties were estimated at over 2,000.

"The British loss was heavy - 643 killed and wounded", including General Fraser.

The action was followed up by a Siege of Deeg Fort (11 – 24 December 1804).

In fiction

 The battle and ensuing siege (together with statistics culled from Duff) are briefly described in G.A.Henty's 1902 book, At the Point of the Bayonet: A Tale of the Mahratta War

References
 
MacFarlane, Charles. A history of British India: from the earliest English intercourse to the present time
Duff, James Grant. A History of the Mahrattas, vol. 3, p. 290

Conflicts in 1804
1804 in India
Battles of the Second Anglo-Maratha War
Battles involving the British East India Company
Battles involving the Maratha Empire
History of Bharatpur, Rajasthan
November 1804 events